Flor Marcelino,  (born October 5, 1951) is a politician in Manitoba, Canada. She was elected to the Legislative Assembly of Manitoba in the 2007 provincial election, for the electoral division of Wellington. In the 2011 provincial election, she was re-elected to a second term in office in the new electoral district of Logan. Marcelino is a member of the New Democratic Party. On May 7, 2016, she was named interim leader of the party and leader of the opposition in the Manitoba legislature following the defeat of the NDP government in the provincial election and the resignation of party leader Greg Selinger.

She retired from the legislature at the 2019 Manitoba general election. Her daughter, Malaya Marcelino, was elected as a first-time MLA in that same election.

Background

Marcelino was the first woman of colour to be elected as a MLA in the province.

Prior to her election to the legislature, Marcelino was editor and publisher of The Philippine Times, a community newspaper for the Filipino Canadian community in Winnipeg. Her brother-in-law Ted Marcelino was also elected to the Legislative Assembly in 2011.

Electoral history

References

External links
 Official Website

Canadian politicians of Filipino descent
Filipino emigrants to Canada
Women government ministers of Canada
Living people
Members of the Executive Council of Manitoba
New Democratic Party of Manitoba MLAs
Politicians from Winnipeg
Women MLAs in Manitoba
Female Canadian political party leaders
21st-century Canadian politicians
21st-century Canadian women politicians
1951 births